Alexander Gerald Skeel (born 17 August 1994) is an English football coach and domestic violence survivor whose near-fatal abuse at the hands of his girlfriend, Jordan Worth (born 1995), attracted widespread media coverage owing to the extreme nature of the abuse. Worth controlled, beat, stabbed, starved and tortured Skeel, leaving him with severed tendons, fluid on the brain and burns. She also prevented him from receiving medical treatment for injuries she inflicted.

Worth became the first woman to be convicted of the United Kingdom's coercive control offence and in 2018 was jailed for a total of seven and half years for her crimes. She was released in January 2022 after serving half her sentence. 

Skeel has been interviewed numerous times in the media about the abuse he suffered and his story was told in a BBC Three documentary Abused By My Girlfriend which was first shown in February 2019. He is an Ambassador for domestic violence charity The ManKind Initiative.

Early life
Skeel was born prematurely on 17 August 1995 along with his twin brother. Weighing just two pounds, he was placed in intensive care and underwent multiple operations as a baby. They lived in Stewartby, south of Bedford. The twins were child models for supermarket chain Asda.

Relationship with Worth
Skeel and Jordan Worth met at college in 2012 when they were both aged 16. Worth, previously a gymnast, later attended the University of Hertfordshire, obtaining a degree in Fine Arts; she wanted to become a teacher. At the age of eighteen Worth became pregnant with their first child, a son, and after his birth the couple moved to Stewartby. They broke up in June 2017, not long after the birth of their daughter.

Domestic abuse
Worth's abuse had begun early in the relationship, controlling which clothes Skeel wore and assaulting him. Skeel was isolated from his family, with Worth sending messages from his phone telling them not to contact him any more. She then broke his mobile phone and took over his social media accounts, setting up a Facebook account in his name which she controlled. She falsely told Skeel that his grandfather had died, and then berated him for caring about his family, after he cried about the news.

The abuse escalated, with coercive control deemed to have occurred between April 2016 and June 2017.

Trial of Worth 
At her trial in April 2018, Worth pleaded guilty to controlling or coercive behaviour in an intimate relationship, wounding with intent and causing grievous bodily harm. She was sentenced to seven and a half years of imprisonment. In June 2018, after a referral under the unduly lenient sentence scheme, the Court of Appeal determined that while her sentence was undoubtedly "very lenient" it was not unduly so, and she was spared an increase of her sentence. Worth refused to attend the hearing, but her solicitor claimed she felt remorse.

Imprisonment and release of Worth 
In February 2019, it was reported that Worth's Facebook account had continued to post while she was in prison, and that posts were being shared about male domestic violence indicating that she believes she is the victim. It is believed someone was sharing the links on her behalf, as prisoners are banned from updating their Facebook accounts while serving their sentence. However, in January 2022 Worth began sharing images of herself on the account again for the first time since 2018, indicating that she has been released after serving half her sentence, something which occurs automatically in the UK and in 90% of cases of imprisonment.

See also 

 Earl Silverman

References

External links
About Us - mankind.org.uk

1995 births
Incidents of violence against men
Living people
ManKind Initiative people
People from Bedfordshire
People from Luton
Violence against men in Europe
Violence against men in the United Kingdom